Yona is a village in the United States territory of Guam.

History 

Yona was historically a farming community but today is mostly residential. During World War II, the Japanese forced the indigenous Chamorros to march from camps in northern Guam to prison camps in Yona shortly before the Americans liberated the island. Japanese tanks in the area near the Segua River serve as reminders of the war.

Today, the LeoPalace Resort is located in the Manenggon Hills. The LeoPalace Resort is also used for association football.

Geography 
The village center is located above the cliffs between Pago Bay and Ylig Bay. Residential areas of Baza Gardens and Windward Hills are located to the south.

The U.S. Census Bureau recognizes two census-designated places in the municipality: Yona, and Windward Hills.

Sites of interest 

 Sigua Falls
 Tarzan Falls
 Taga'chang Beach Park
 Windward Hills Golf Course
 Country Club of the Pacific Golf Course
 LeoPalace Resort Country Club

Education

Primary and secondary schools

Public schools
Guam Public School System serves the island.

Manuel U. Lujan Elementary School in Yona and Inarajan Middle School in Inarajan serve Yona.

Southern High School in Santa Rita serves the village.

Private schools
Guam Adventist Academy is located in Yona.
St.Francis Catholic School is located in Yona.

Public libraries
Guam Public Library System operates the Yona Library at 265 Sister Mary Eucharita Drive.

Notable people
 Ken Joe Ada - Politician. Mayor of Yona
 Frank B. Aguon Jr. - Politician. Senator
 Pedo Terlaje - Politician. Senator
 Therese M. Terlaje - Politician. Senator and Speaker.

Government

See also 
 Villages of Guam

References 

 Rogers, Robert F (1995). Destiny's Landfall: A History of Guam: University of Hawai'i Press.

External links 
 Yona Guam at Guam Portal
 Map of Yona from PDN
 Guampedia, Guam's Online Encyclopedia Yona Village
 War in the Pacific NHP: Journey to Manengon

Villages in Guam
Census-designated places in Guam